Blackbourn is a surname. Notable people with the surname include:

David Blackbourn (born 1949), British historian
Elizabeth Blackbourn, English table tennis player
Lisle Blackbourn (1899–1983), American football coach
Robert Blackbourn (died 1748), English Jacobite

See also
Blackbourn Hundred, a hundred of Suffolk, England
Blackburn (disambiguation)